Hildegard Bussmann (24 November 1914 – 10 January 1988) was an international table tennis player from Germany. She was born in Düsseldorf.

Table tennis career
From 1934 to 1939 she won eight medals in singles, doubles and team events in the World Table Tennis Championships.

The eight World Championship medals included two gold medals in the doubles with Gertrude Pritzi at the 1939 World Table Tennis Championships and the team event at the 1939 World Table Tennis Championships.

See also
 List of table tennis players
 List of World Table Tennis Championships medalists

References

German female table tennis players
1914 births
1988 deaths
Sportspeople from Düsseldorf